Peribona is a monotypic moth genus of the family Crambidae described by Pieter Cornelius Tobias Snellen in 1895. It contains only one species, Peribona venosa, described by Arthur Gardiner Butler in 1889, which is found in the Himalayas and on Java.

References

 Retrieved April 23, 2018.

Pyraustinae
Monotypic moth genera
Crambidae genera
Taxa named by Pieter Cornelius Tobias Snellen